Jen Currin is an American/Canadian poet and fiction writer. Born and raised in Portland, Oregon, she is currently based in Vancouver, British Columbia and teaches creative writing at Kwantlen Polytechnic University. Her 2010 collection The Inquisition Yours won the Audre Lorde Award for Lesbian Poetry in 2011, and was shortlisted for that year's Lambda Literary Award, Dorothy Livesay Poetry Prize and ReLit Award. Her 2014 collection School was a finalist for the Pat Lowther Award, the Dorothy Livesay Prize, and a ReLit Award.

Currin has published two prior poetry collections, The Sleep of Four Cities and Hagiography.

Her debut short story collection, Hider/Seeker, was published in 2018. It won a Canadian Independent Book Award and was shortlisted for the 2019 ReLit Award for short fiction.

Personal life
She earned a bachelor's degree in English from Bard College, where she studied with John Ashbery, who was her undergraduate thesis advisor. She did her MFA in creative writing at Arizona State University, studying with poets Norman Dubie and Beckian Fritz Goldberg, and her master's degree in English at Simon Fraser University.

Works
The Sleep of Four Cities (2005, Anvil Press). .
Hagiography (2008, Coach House Books). .
The Inquisition Yours (2010, Coach House Books). .
School (2014, Coach House Books). .Hider/Seeker'' (2018, Anvil Press). .

References

American women poets
Canadian women poets
American LGBT poets
Canadian lesbian writers
Writers from Portland, Oregon
Writers from Vancouver
American emigrants to Canada
Living people
Year of birth missing (living people)
21st-century American poets
21st-century Canadian poets
Canadian LGBT poets
21st-century Canadian women writers
Canadian women short story writers
21st-century Canadian short story writers
21st-century American women writers
American lesbian writers
21st-century Canadian LGBT people